Sun Chemical is the world's largest producer of printing inks and pigments and is located in Parsippany-Troy Hills, New Jersey. It was incorporated in 1945. The company has its roots as the Lorilleux & Cie. Paris in 1818, but was incorporated under the Sun name in 1945. The company operates the Daniel J. Carlick Technical Center in Carlstadt, New Jersey.

Sun Chemical is a member of the DIC Corporation group of companies based in Japan. The company provides materials to packaging, publication, coatings, plastics, cosmetics and other industrial markets, including electronic materials, functional and specialty coatings, brand protection and product authentication technologies.

References

External links

 

Companies based in Morris County, New Jersey
Manufacturing companies based in New Jersey
Chemical companies established in 1945
Parsippany-Troy Hills, New Jersey
Chemical companies of the United States